Johan Martin Ferner (né Johan Martin Jacobsen; 22 July 192724 January 2015) was a Norwegian sailor and Olympic medalist. He won a silver medal in the 6 metre class with the boat Elisabeth X at the 1952 Summer Olympics in Helsinki, together with Finn Ferner (his brother), Erik Heiberg, Tor Arneberg and Carl Mortensen. He was married to Princess Astrid, the sister of King Harald V of Norway and Princess Ragnhild.

Family 

Johan Ferner was the son of master tailor Ferner Jacobsen (18841964), who established a department store in Oslo, and his wife, Ragnhild Olsen (18891966). He inherited the department store in 1964. Ferner was originally his father's given name and was adopted as a family name by Johan Martin Ferner and his siblings. His grandfather was maritime pilot Johan Martin Jacobsen (18501907) from Tjøme, son of blacksmith Jacob Andreas Knudsen (18191868).

Marriages and children 
Firstly, on 20 January 1953, Johan Ferner married artist Ingeborg 'Bitte' Hesselberg-Meyer (later Rostad; 19311997). They divorced 1956. He then remarried at Asker Church outside Oslo on 12 January 1961 to Princess Astrid of Norway, the second daughter of King Olav V of Norway and Princess Märtha of Sweden.

The couple had five children:
 Cathrine Ferner (b. 22 July 1962, Oslo), married 9 December 1989 in Oslo, Arild Johansen (b. 18 June 1961, Oslo), and has two children:
 Sebastian Ferner Johansen (b. 9 March 1990, Oslo).
 Nicoline Johansen (b. 2019)
 Ferdinand Johansen (b. 2021)
 Madeleine Ferner Johansen (b. 7 March 1993, Oslo), married 17 October 2022 in Oslo, Ole Aleksander.
 Benedikte Ferner (b. 27 September 1963, Oslo), married firstly 30 April 1994 in Oslo (divorced 1998) Rolf Woods (b. 17 June 1963, Oslo), without issue, and married secondly on 2 December 2000 in Oslo and separated in 2002, Mons Einar Stange (b. 26 May 1962, Oslo), without issue.
 Alexander Ferner (b. 15 March 1965, Oslo), married 27 July 1996 in Holmenkollen Kapell, Oslo, Margrét Gudmundsdóttir (b. 27 March 1966, Reykjavík, Iceland), and has two children:
 Edward Ferner (b. 28 March 1996, Bærum, Norway).
 Stella Ferner (b. 23 April 1998, Bærum, Norway).
 Elisabeth Ferner (b. 30 March 1969, Oslo), married 3 October 1992 in Oslo, Tom Folke Beckmann (b. 14 January 1963, Oslo), and has one son:
 Benjamin Ferner Beckmann (b. 25 April 1999, Oslo).
 Carl-Christian Ferner (b. 22 October 1972, Oslo), married 4 October 2014 in Oslo, Anna-Stina Slattum Karlsen (b. 23 February 1984). He works for the family business, Ferner Jacobsen AS.
 Fay Ferner (b. 10 July 2018)
 Fam Ferner (b. 28 January 2021)

Honours

National honours
 : Knight Commander of the Order of St. Olav
 : Recipient of the Medal of the 100th Anniversary of the Birth of King Haakon VII
 : Recipient of the King Olav V Silver Jubilee Medal
 : Recipient of the King Olav V Commemorative Medal
 : Recipient of the Medal of the 100th Anniversary of the Birth of King Olav V
 : Recipient of the Royal House Centenary Medal

Foreign honours
 : Knight Grand Officer of the Order of Leopold II
 : Grand Cross of the Order of Merit
 : Commander of the Order of Merit of the Federal Republic of Germany
 : Knight Grand Cordon of the Order of Independence
 : Knight Commander of the Order of Adolphe of Nassau, Special Class
 : Knight Commander of the Order of the Crown
 : Knight Grand Officer of the Order of Isabella the Catholic
 : Recipient of 50th Birthday Medal of King Carl XVI

Ancestry

References

External links

 

1927 births
2015 deaths
People from Asker
Norwegian male sailors (sport)
Olympic sailors of Norway
Sailors at the 1952 Summer Olympics – 6 Metre
Olympic silver medalists for Norway
Olympic medalists in sailing
Medalists at the 1952 Summer Olympics
Recipients of the Order of Leopold II
Grand Officers of the Order of Leopold II
Recipients of the Ordre national du Mérite
Grand Cross of the Ordre national du Mérite
Commanders Crosses of the Order of Merit of the Federal Republic of Germany
Recipients of the Order of Independence (Jordan)
Grand Cordons of the Order of Independence (Jordan)
Recipients of the Order of the Crown (Netherlands)
Recipients of the Order of Isabella the Catholic
Commanders by Number of the Order of Isabella the Catholic
Sportspeople from Viken (county)